Bednarz is a Polish surname. It may refer to:
 Andrzej Bednarz (born 1980), Polish football player
 Jacek Bednarz (born 1967), Polish football player
 Frédéric Bednarz, Canadian violinist
 Klaus Bednarz (1942–2015), German journalist
 Stefan Bednarz, The Scar (1976 film) character

See also
 Bednarz Cove in Antarctica